Puurmani Parish was a rural municipality in eastern Estonia. It was a part of Jõgeva County. The municipality had a population of 1,895 (as of 1 January 2004) and covered an area of 292.56 km². The population density was 6.5 inhabitants per km².

Administrative centre of the municipality was Puurmani small borough with population of 800. There were also 12 villages in Puurmani Parish: Altnurga, Härjanurme, Jõune, Jüriküla, Kirikuvalla, Kursi, Laasme, Pikknurme, Pööra, Saduküla, Tammiku, Tõrve.

Pedja River flows through the former municipality.

References

External links